Events in the year 1672 in Norway.

Incumbents
Monarch: Christian V

Events
 Christiansholm Fortress was built.

Arts and literature

Births
Sara Hammond, landowner and businesswoman (died 1716).

Deaths

18 May – Erik Bredal, bishop (born 1608).

See also

References